Richard B. Seabrook (1910 – 31 January 1986) was a British trade unionist and politician.

Early life 
Seabrook grew up in Chelmsford, and worked repairing shoes for the Chelmsford Star Co-operative Society.  He joined the National Union of Distributive and Allied Workers (NUDAW) in 1926, and in 1931 he also joined the Communist Party of Great Britain (CPGB).  He was highly active in the party and the associated National Unemployed Workers' Movement.  With his brother, Alfred, in 1932, he led five hundred unemployed workers invading the Shire Hall chamber.  Also with Alfred, he revived Chelmsford Trades Council in 1932, it having been dormant for several years.

In 1937, Seabrook began working full-time for NUDAW as an area organiser.  Ten years later, NUDAW became part of the new Union of Shop, Distributive and Allied Workers (USDAW).  Seabrook remained an area organiser, but was relocated to Norwich.  He remained active in the CPGB, serving as district chairman and treasurer during the early 1950s.

Seabrook was elected to the executive council of USDAW in 1957.  When union president Walter Padley was made a government minister in 1964, Seabrook won the election to succeed him, but he then lost the regularly scheduled election the following year, defeated by Rodney Hanes.  In 1967, there was a further presidential election, and Seabrook won the position back, on this occasion serving until defeated by Jim D. Hughes in 1973.

Seabrook opposed the Soviet invasion of Hungary in 1956, and resigned from the CPGB, later becoming associated with the Chartist group.  Despite not being a member of Norwich City Council, in 1972/73 he served as Lord Mayor of Norwich, the last non-council member to hold the post.  He was described by Patrick Palgrave-Moore as "one of the most controversial figures in recent times to hold office".

References

1910 births
1986 deaths
Communist Party of Great Britain members
Mayors of Norwich
People from Chelmsford
Presidents of British trade unions